William Grigg,  (died 9 April 1726) D.D. was Master of Clare College from 1713 until his death.

Morgan was born in Middlesex and educated at St Paul's School, London and Jesus College, Cambridge. He became Fellow of Jesus in 1696.  He was ordained a priest in the Church of England in 1707. He held livings at Whittlesford and Trowbridge. Wilcox was Vice-Chancellor of the University of Cambridge between 1716 and 1717.

He died on 9 April 1726.

References

Masters of Clare College, Cambridge
Fellows of Jesus College, Cambridge
Alumni of Jesus College, Cambridge
1736 deaths
People from Middlesex
18th-century English Anglican priests
Vice-Chancellors of the University of Cambridge
People educated at St Paul's School, London